Calamity Jane was an all-female American grunge/punk band, formed in Portland, Oregon, United States, in 1989.

Gilly Ann Hanner (vocals/guitar) and Lisa Koenig (drums) started playing together as a band in 1988 along with Ronna Era (bass). After a few live appearances Hanner's sister Megan took over on bass and the band was renamed Calamity Jane the following year. Their first gig was supporting Scrawl. The band then supported Fugazi on their 1990 tour.

The band released three singles and an album Martha Jane Cannary with their original line up, and a final single with Marcéo Martinez - later of Team Dresch) on drums and Joanna Bolme (later of Quasi and The Jicks) on bass.

The band played two support slots with Nirvana. One of these shows, in Buenos Aires, Argentina, ended in Calamity Jane being booed off the stage, which motivated Nirvana to intentionally sabotage their own performance.

Line-up
Gilly Ann Hanner (vocals, guitar) 
Megan Hanner (bass)
Lisa Koenig (drums) 
Marcéo Martinez (drums) 1992
Joanna Bolme (bass, guitar) 1992

Discography
"Hang Up"/"You Got It Rough"/"Outta Money", Brimstone Productions, 7", 1990
"Say It"/"Little Girl", Imp Records, 7", 1991 
"My Spit"/"Miss Hell", SRI, 7" 1991 
Martha Jane Cannary, SMR Records, Jealous Butcher, LP/CD, 1991
"Love Song"/"Believe", Tim/Kerr Records, 7", 1992

Track listing

References

External links
Discography at Discogs

All-female punk bands
Alternative rock groups from Oregon
Proto-riot grrrl bands
American grunge groups
Punk rock groups from Oregon
1989 establishments in Oregon
Musical groups from Portland, Oregon